Alexa Hirschfeld is an entrepreneur. Hirschfeld co-founded the online invitation website Paperless Post.

Work

Alexa and James Hirschfeld, started Paperless Post while he was a student at Harvard and she was working in New York City in 2008. Paperless Post launched in 2009. Today, she serves as the President of Paperless Post, working alongside her brother, who serves as Chief Executive Officer.

References

Harvard University alumni
Living people
Year of birth missing (living people)
American company founders
American women company founders
21st-century American women